James McGregor Fairlie is a Scottish National Party (SNP) politician who has been the Member of the Scottish Parliament (MSP) for Perthshire South and Kinross-shire since May 2021.

Early life
In 1996, as a sheep farmer, Fairlie launched Perth Farmers' Market. His father Jim Fairlie was a senior member of the SNP for several decades and stood as an unsuccessful candidate in several elections; his brother Andrew (died 2019) was a renowned chef.

Political career
Fairlie was a co-founder of Farmers4Yes, a pro-Scottish independence campaign group.

In September 2020, Fairlie announced his intention to seek election to the Scottish Parliament.

On 8 May 2021 he was elected as a Member of the Scottish Parliament (MSP) for Perthshire South and Kinross-shire. In February 2023, he issued a statement explaining that would continue to support Kate Forbes for leader of the SNP, despite disagreeing with her views on social political issues like marriage equality, abortion rights etc.

References

External links 
 

Year of birth missing (living people)
Living people
Scottish National Party MSPs
Members of the Scottish Parliament 2021–2026
Scottish farmers
People from Perth and Kinross